Ioannis Giannouris (born 13 January 1958) is a retired Greek water polo player who competed in the 1980 Summer Olympics.

See also
 Greece men's Olympic water polo team records and statistics
 List of men's Olympic water polo tournament goalkeepers

References

External links
 
 
 

1958 births
Living people
Greek male water polo players
Water polo goalkeepers
Olympic water polo players of Greece
Water polo players at the 1980 Summer Olympics